The Walton 25 is a trailerable sailboat first built in 1961. It was sold under a number of names, including Continental Folkboat, Whitby 25 Folkboat, Great Lakes Folkboat as well as Walton 25.

The boat is a development of Tord Sundén's International Folkboat design.

Production
The design was built by Whitby Boat Works in Canada, starting in 1961. It was sold in the US by yacht broker George P. Walton, but it is now out of production.

Design
The Walton 25 is a recreational keelboat, built predominantly of fiberglass, with wood trim. It has a masthead sloop rig, a spooned raked stem, a sharply angled transom, a transom-hung rudder controlled by a tiller and a fixed long keel. It displaces  and carries an estimated  of ballast.

The design has sleeping accommodation for four people, with a double "V"-berth in the bow cabin and two straight settee berths in the main cabin. The galley is located on both sides of the companionway ladder, with a single-burner stove to starboard and sink to port. The head is located just aft of the bow cabin on the starboard side.

Operational history
In a 2010 review Steve Henkel wrote, "we wish we had more information on this boat. Best features: Like other Folkboat designs, she is probably a good sea boat, has good tracking ability, and good pointing ability, and looks pretty. Her doghouse cabin gives good headroom for a 25-footer. Worst features: Low coach roof and narrow beam give the cabin a closed-in feeling. Low freeboard relative to comp[etitor]s may give a wet ride in rough conditions."

See also
List of sailing boat types

Related development
IF-boat

References

Keelboats
1960s sailboat type designs
Sailing yachts
Trailer sailers
Sailboat type designs by Tord Sundén
Sailboat types built by Whitby Boat Works